Odontosoria is a genus of ferns in the family Lindsaeaceae.

Taxonomy
, the Checklist of Ferns and Lycophytes of the World recognized the following species:

Other species include:

Odontosoria celebesiana (Barcelona & Hickey) comb. ined.
Odontosoria colombiana Maxon
?Odontosoria decomposita (Baker) C.Chr.
Odontosoria flabellifolia (Baker) C.Chr.
?Odontosoria goudotiana (Kunze) Christenh.
Odontosoria gymnogrammoides Christ
Odontosoria humbertii (Tardieu) Christenh.
Odontosoria krameri Fraser-Jenk.
?Odontosoria madagascariensis (Baker) Christenh.
Odontosoria odontolabia (Baker) Diels
Odontosoria quadripinnata Lehtonen
Odontosoria reyesii Caluff
Odontosoria veitchii (Baker) Parris
?Odontosoria viridis Kuhn
Odontosoria yaeyamensis (S.J.Lin, M.Kato & K.Iwats.) Ebihara

, Plants of the World Online places all three species of Sphenomeris in Odontosoria:
Odontosoria clavata (L.) J.Sm. = Sphenomeris clavata
Odontosoria killipii (Maxon) R.M.Tryon & A.F.Tryon = Sphenomeris killipii
Odontosoria spathulata (Maxon) R.M.Tryon & A.F.Tryon = Sphenomeris spathulata

References

Lindsaeaceae
Fern genera